Llangar is a former civil parish in Denbighshire in Wales,  south west of Corwen, its post town, and  north east of Bala. It is situated at the confluence of the rivers Alwen and Dee, and includes the small hamlets of Bryn, Cymer, and Gwynodl. A large portion of the parish is barren. The small village stands on the road from Corwen, by the Vale of Edeyrnion. It lies in the bro and former cwmwd of Edeirnion.

Llangar Church is a remote rural church that was abandoned in 1856 but survived to become a Cadw guardianship building, open to the public, with a near complete 18th century church interior, and is a Grade 1 listed building.

Notable residents
Henry Wynn-Williams, an early New Zealand member of parliament, was born in Llangar

Villages in Denbighshire